The sixth and final season of the American television drama series Empire premiered on September 24, 2019, in the United States on Fox. The season was ordered on April 30, 2019. The show is produced by 20th Century Fox Television, in association with Imagine Entertainment, Lee Daniels Entertainment, Danny Strong Productions and Little Chicken Inc. The showrunners for this season are Mahoney, Danny Strong and Lee Daniels.

Cast and characters

Main cast
 Terrence Howard as Lucious Lyon
 Taraji P. Henson as Cookie Lyon 
 Bryshere Y. Gray as Hakeem Lyon
 Trai Byers as Andre Lyon
 Gabourey Sidibe as Becky Williams
 Ta'Rhonda Jones as Porsha Taylor
 Serayah as Tiana Brown 
 Vivica A. Fox as Candace Holloway Mason
 Nicole Ari Parker as Giselle Sims
 Meta Golding as Teri Lyon
 A.Z. Kelsey as Jeff Kingsley 
 Rhyon Nicole Brown as Maya
 Mario as Devon
 Katlynn Simone as Treasure
 Wood Harris as Damon Cross

Guest cast
 Alexandra Grey as Melody Barnes 
 Kiandra Richardson as Yana Cross 
 Amanda Detmer as Tracy Kingsley
 Tasha Smith as Carol Holloway
 Skylan Brooks as Quincy 
David Banner as Philly Street
Veronika Bozeman as Veronica
Keesha Sharp as Dr. Paula Wick 
Robert Ri'chard as Julian Sims
Leslie Uggams as Leah Walker
Mario Van Peebles as Uncle Ray
Kash Doll as herself

Episodes

Production
After allegations that Smollett staged his own attack, on April 30, 2019, it was announced that although Fox Entertainment had extended his contract for season six, there were no plans for the character to appear during the season.

On June 4, 2019, series co-creator Lee Daniels officially announced that Smollett would not be returning for the sixth and final season.

On September 3, 2019, it was announced Katlynn Simone, Meta Golding, Wood Harris, Mario and Vivica A. Fox had been promoted  to series regulars for the final season.

In April 2020, it was confirmed that the series would conclude with its 18th episode, instead of the 20th, which was originally set to be the series finale. Episode 18 was the final episode that had completed production before the COVID-19 pandemic caused Hollywood productions to be shut down. Footage from the uncompleted nineteenth episode was included in the final aired version of the eighteenth episode in an attempt to provide closure.

Reception

Ratings

References

External links

2019 American television seasons
2020 American television seasons
Empire (2015 TV series) seasons
Television productions suspended due to the COVID-19 pandemic